Miklós Hegedűs (born 2 December 1946 in Rábasömjén) is a Hungarian former wrestler who competed in the 1972 Summer Olympics.

References

External links 
 
 

1946 births
Living people
Olympic wrestlers of Hungary
Wrestlers at the 1972 Summer Olympics
Hungarian male sport wrestlers